The following is an episode guide to The Tracey Ullman Show, which ran from 1987 to 1990. 

Nearly every episode featured a song, most of them covers. These were either incorporated into a segment's score or performed by Ullman and/or the cast. They are noted in each episode's summary. However, some episodes featured original songs; their titles remain unknown and unlisted. 

The name Bonita Carlisle is the nom de plume for the show's writing staff. 

The Simpsons and the first season's Dr. N!Godatu were penned by Matt Groening and M.K. Brown. Season 4 didn't feature any animated segments, except for a rerun of "Simpson Xmas" for the show's Christmas-themed episode.

Series overview

Episodes

Season 1 (1987)

Season 2 (1987–88)

Special (1988)

Season 3 (1988–89)

Season 4 (1989–90)

References

External links

Tracey Ullman
Tracey Ullman